Open Mathematics is a peer-reviewed open access scientific journal covering all areas of mathematics. It is published by Walter de Gruyter and the editors-in-chief are Salvatore Angelo Marano (University of Catania) and Vincenzo Vespri (University of Florence).

Abstracting and indexing 
The journal is abstracted and indexed in Science Citation Index Expanded, Current Contents/Physical, Chemical & Earth Sciences, Mathematical Reviews, Zentralblatt MATH, and Scopus. According to the Journal Citation Reports, the journal has a 2018 impact factor of 0.726.

History 
The journal was established in 2003 as the Central European Journal of Mathematics and published by Versita, since 2012 part of Walter de Gruyter, in collaboration with Springer Science+Business Media. In 2014 it was moved to the Walter de Gruyter imprint and started charging Article processing charge. In protest, the editor-in-chief and the quasi-totality of the editorial board resigned and, in August 2014, established a new journal, the European Journal of Mathematics.

Editors-in-chief 
The following persons have been editors-in-chief of the journal:
 Andrzej Białynicki-Birula (University of Warsaw; 2003–2004)
 Grigory Margulis (Yale University; 2004–2009)
 Fedor Bogomolov (Courant Institute of Mathematical Sciences; 2009–2014)
 Ugo Gianazza (University of Pavia; 2014–2019)
 Vincenzo Vespri (University of Florence; 2014–present)
 Salvatore Angelo Marano (University of Catania; 2020-present)

References

External links 
 

Publications established in 2003
Mathematics journals
English-language journals
De Gruyter academic journals
Creative Commons Attribution-licensed journals